Charles R. Wilson (born October 14, 1954) is a United States circuit judge of the United States Court of Appeals for the Eleventh Circuit.

Education

Wilson was born in Pensacola, Florida in 1954. He is a graduate of Jesuit High School of Tampa. He received his Bachelor of Arts degree from the University of Notre Dame in 1976 and his Juris Doctor from Notre Dame Law School in 1979.

Career

Following graduation from law school, he served as a law clerk for Judge Joseph W. Hatchett of the United States Court of Appeals for the Fifth Circuit from 1979 to 1980. From 1980 to 1981, he served as an Assistant County Attorney in Hillsborough County, Florida. Following a five-year stint in private practice based in Tampa, he was appointed as a county state judge in Hillsborough County in 1986, serving in that capacity until 1990. From 1994 to 1999, he served as the United States Attorney for the Middle District of Florida.

Federal judicial service

United States magistrate judge service 
In 1990 he was appointed as a United States magistrate judge of the United States District Court for the Middle District of Florida, serving until 1994.

Court of appeals service 
President Bill Clinton nominated Wilson to the United States Court of Appeals for the Eleventh Circuit on May 27, 1999, to replace the vacancy created when Joseph W. Hatchett, his former boss who had since been transferred from the 5th Circuit to the 11th Circuit, retired. Wilson's nomination was relatively uncontroversial, earning bipartisan support from both of his state's senators, Bob Graham and Connie Mack III. Wilson was confirmed by the Senate by voice vote on July 30, 1999. He received his judicial commission on August 9, 1999.

See also 
 List of African-American federal judges
 List of African-American jurists

References

Sources

11th Circuit Court of Appeals Profile

1954 births
Living people
African-American judges
African-American lawyers
Florida lawyers
Florida state court judges
Jesuit High School (Tampa) alumni
Judges of the United States Court of Appeals for the Eleventh Circuit
Notre Dame Law School alumni
People from Pensacola, Florida
People from Tampa, Florida
United States Attorneys for the Middle District of Florida
United States court of appeals judges appointed by Bill Clinton
United States magistrate judges
University of Notre Dame alumni
20th-century American judges
21st-century American judges